Comical Corner or Comical Corners is an unincorporated community located within Pemberton Township in Burlington County, New Jersey, United States. The site of the actual corners is at the intersection of Pemberton Road (County Route 630) and Arneys Mount Road (CR 668). The original name may have been "Conical Corner" based on the cone-like shape of the skewed intersection but had turned to "Comical Corner" based on a mishearing. The area, located just to the north of Pemberton Borough, is mostly rural and is surrounded by farmland on the two obtuse sides of the intersection.

References

Pemberton Township, New Jersey
Unincorporated communities in Burlington County, New Jersey
Unincorporated communities in New Jersey